"Du, die Wanne ist voll" is a parody of the song, "You're the One That I Want", by German comedians Helga Feddersen and Dieter Hallervorden. It was released as a single in 1978.

It is sung in a bizarre mixture of German and English, with the middle-aged Hallervorden and Feddersen pretending to be youthful lovers. The music video was produced by NDR. "Du, die Wanne ist voll" literally translates to "You, the bathtub is full", fitting in syllable-length, and the joke consists of partially using German words that sound similar to the English ones.
The single reached number four on the German Singles Chart.

1978 singles
1978 songs
Grease (musical)
Novelty songs
Comedy songs
Musical parodies
German-language songs
Mondegreens